Let's Sing Out was a Canadian music television series which aired on CTV from 1963 to 1966, then on CBC Television until 1968.

Premise
This series, patterned after the American Hootenanny show, featured contemporary folk music hosted by folk musician Oscar Brand. Episodes were filmed on location at universities and geared towards post-secondary school audiences.

Guests included such artists as Eric Andersen, Phil Ochs, Tom Rush, Simon & Garfunkel, Joni Mitchell, Josh White Jr. and The Clancy Brothers.

Scheduling
Let's Sing Out began in 1963 on CTV. The series was broadcast on the CBC network. This began on October 7, 1966. Airing Fridays at 5:30 p.m. (Eastern) until July 7, 1967. It was rebroadcast on CBC from July 5 to 20 September 1968, also in the Friday 5:30 p.m time slot. Let's Sing Out was sold to markets in Australia, New Zealand, and the United Kingdom.

References

External links
 

CBC Television original programming
CTV Television Network original programming
1963 Canadian television series debuts
1968 Canadian television series endings
Folk music mass media